John Pasche (born 24 April 1945) is a British art designer, best known for designing the Rolling Stones'
tongue and lips logo. Pasche completed his BA degree in graphic design from the Brighton College of Art between 1963 and 1967. He completed his MA at the Royal College of Art in London from 1967 to 1970.

Professional career
The Rolling Stones' head office contacted the Royal College of Art in 1970 looking to commission a poster for The Rolling Stones European Tour 1970; the college recommended Pasche. Pasche designed the "Tongue and Lip Design" logo in 1970, for which he was paid just £50 and a further £200 in 1972. Pasche sold his copyright of the logo to the Rolling Stones via its commercial arm (Musidor BV) for £26,000 in 1984. In 2008 the original artwork of the logo was sold in the US to the Victoria and Albert Museum for $92,500, about £71,000 in 2020. The design was revised by Craig Braun while he was designing the album package and was originally reproduced on the U.S. inner sleeve and cover of Sticky Fingers album released in April, 1971. In August 2008, the design was voted the greatest band logo of all time in an online poll conducted by Gigwise. Pasche worked with the Rolling Stones from 1970 until 1974 while he was Junior Art Director at Benton & Bowles advertising agency.

Between 1974 and 1977 he founded and managed Gull Graphics. Pasche later worked with Paul McCartney, The Who, The Stranglers and Dr. Feelgood. He also created the M. C. Escher–inspired band logo of Van der Graaf Generator that first appeared on their album Godbluff. He was art director at United Artists Music Division from 1978 until 1981. From 1981 to 1991 he was Creative Director of Chrysalis Records  and he was Creative Director at the South Bank Centre from 1994 until 2005.

Notes

External links
Official website

1945 births
Living people
Alumni of the University of Brighton
Alumni of the Royal College of Art
English graphic designers
Film poster artists
Southbank Centre